Derek J. Harvey is an American politician and firefighter serving as a member of the Montana House of Representatives from the 74th district. Elected in November 2018, he assumed office on January 7, 2019.

Education 
Harvery earned an associate of applied sciences degree in fire science from Missoula College University of Montana.

Career 
Outside of politics, Harvey serves as a firefighter and EMT with the Butte-Silver Bow Fire Department. He also served as a hazmat technician and rope rescue technician for the department. Harvey was elected to the Montana House of Representatives in November 2018 and assumed office on January 7, 2019.

References 

Living people
American firefighters
University of Montana alumni
Democratic Party members of the Montana House of Representatives
People from Butte, Montana
Year of birth missing (living people)